The 17617 / 17618 Tapovan Express is an express train belonging to Indian Railways – South Central Railway zone that runs between  & Mumbai in India.In the earlier days Tapovan Express was running between Mumbai & manmad later it extended up to Nanded.

It operates as train number 17618 from Huzur Sahib Nanded to Mumbai CSMT and as train number 17617 in the reverse direction, serving the state of Maharashtra.

Tapovan (Sanskrit) comes from the two root words tapasya – meaning specifically austerity, and more generally spiritual practice, and vana, meaning forest, or wilderness.

Coaches

Tapovan Express has 2 AC Chair Car, 10 Second Class seating, 3 General Unreserved & 2 SLR (Seating cum Luggage Rake) coaches.

In addition, it carries a pantry car 
 
As is customary with most train services in India, coach composition may be amended at the discretion of Indian Railways depending on demand.

Service

Routeing

Traction

As the route is undergoing electrification a Guntakal / Pune-based WDM-3A locomotive hauls the train from Hazur Sahib Nanded until  handing over to a Kalyan-based WCAM-2 / WCAM-3 locomotive which powers the train for the remainder of its journey until Mumbai CSMT, and vice versa.

Rake sharing
The train shares its rake with 17687/17688 Marathwada Express.

Operation
Tapovan Express runs on a daily basis in both directions.

References 

 https://www.youtube.com/watch?v=zQytbptkV-w
 https://www.flickr.com/photos/69671278@N02/11869148806/

External links

Transport in Mumbai
Transport in Nanded
Named passenger trains of India
Rail transport in Maharashtra
Express trains in India